The California flying fish, Cheilopogon pinnatibarbatus californicus, is a subspecies of Bennett's flying fish. Prior to the 1970s, the California flying fish was known as a distinct species, with the scientific classification Cypselurus californicus. In fact there are 40 distinct classifications of flying fish. It is found in the Eastern Pacific Ocean, from Oregon to Baja California. As with all other flying fish, the California can not actually fly, but it can launch itself into the air, using its specially adapted fins to glide along the surface.

The California flying fish spends most of its time in the open ocean but come close to shore at night to forage and lay eggs in the protection of kelp beds.

Behavior and Anatomy 
The flying fish commonly seen around Catalina, has large scales, a forked tail and grows to 19 inches long. Although their name is "flying" fish, the California flying fish is technically incapable of flight. As a species, their anatomy and flight mechanics are quite incredible. They are four-winged flying fish, and glide on extended pectoral fins that resemble wings and keep their bodies aloft until they hit the water with a splash.

"Flight" Mechanics 
The California flying fish's key characteristic is that it is seen to be able to "fly". It is believed that as a species, flying fish developed the flying mechanism to evade oceanic predators. The California flying fish typically makes up to five successive flights of decreasing distance and height at a time. The flying fishes evolutionary streamline body (which reduces drag) and winglike pectoral fins (that can be laid flat) allow for this species of fish to "fly".

Habitat 
When it comes to the habitat in which these flying fish live in, the mean sea surface temperature is the largest factor in determining so. Environmental characteristics like this define the fishes' gliding behavior. For the California flying fish, its flight is energetically limited by water temperature, so its population richness is limited to southern California and Baja California waters. Data shows that for the Cheilopogon Californicus, their top speed is ten meters per second and can only be achieved at temperatures above 20 degrees Celsius. Flying fish are marine species that prefer a tropical and temperate climate as a result. The eastern tropical Pacific Ocean (ETP) supports the vast majority of the species and their predators. The fish does not have a niche diet and can find cyanobacteria and small eukaryotes almost anywhere. Thus their habitat at a taxonomic scale spans from the Atlantic and Pacific coasts of the United States to also the Atlantic, Pacific, and Indian oceans.

Diet 
Flying fish are large enough to eat zooplankton, but small enough to be consumed by top predators. For this reason, flying fish form a central mid-trophic component on epipelagic oceanic food webs.

References

California flying fish
Taxa named by James Graham Cooper